Raoul Cabrol (1895–1956) was a French caricaturist.

1895 births
1956 deaths
French caricaturists